Crossomeles is a genus of beetles in the family Cerambycidae, first described by Chemsak & Noguera in 1993.

Species 
Crossomeles contains the following species:

 Crossomeles acutipennis Chemsak & Noguera, 1993
 Crossomeles aureopilis (Fisher, 1953)
 Crossomeles copei Nearns & Swift, 2022
 Crossomeles oscarcastilloi Nearns & Swift, 2022

References

Rhinotragini